Billy Chapel may refer to:
Billy Chapel (character), title character of the book For Love of the Game by Michael Shaara
Billy Chapel (figure skater), American ice skater, in the United States Figure Skating Championships